The 50th Directors Guild of America Awards, honoring the outstanding directorial achievements in films, documentary and television in 1997, were presented on March 7, 1998 at the Hyatt Regency Century Plaza and the Windows on the World. The nominees in the feature film category were announced on January 26, 1998 and the other nominations were announced starting on February 3, 1998.

Winners and nominees

Film

Television

Commercials

D.W. Griffith Award
 Francis Ford Coppola

Lifetime Achievement in Sports Direction
 Craig Janoff

Lifetime Achievement in News Direction
 Robert E. Vitarelli

Frank Capra Achievement Award
 Bob Jeffords

Robert B. Aldrich Service Award
 Martha Coolidge

Franklin J. Schaffner Achievement Award
 C.J. Rapp Pittman

Presidents Award
 George Sidney

References

External links
 

Directors Guild of America Awards
1997 film awards
Direct
Direct
1997 television awards
Directors
1998 in Los Angeles
1998 in New York City
March 1998 events in the United States